Cohen Jasper (born ) is a South African rugby union player for the . His regular position is fullback.

Jasper was named in the  squad for the 2021 Currie Cup Premier Division.

References

South African rugby union players
Living people
2000 births
Rugby union fullbacks
Free State Cheetahs players
Cheetahs (rugby union) players
Rugby union players from the Western Cape